The brown meagre or corb (Sciaena umbra) is a species of croaker found in, the eastern Atlantic, Mediterranean Sea and Black Sea occurring in shallow waters and sandy bottoms. It is harvested for human consumption, especially in the Mediterranean.

Etymology
The specific name umbra is derived from the Latin for a shadow or phantom while the generic name is derived from the Greek skiaina or skion meaning a fish, or more specifically a red mullet.

Distribution
The brown meagre is found in the eastern Atlantic Ocean from the southern English Channel south to Senegal and Cape Verde, including the Canary Islands, records from West Africa south of Senegal are questionable. Also in the Mediterranean Sea, the Black Sea and Sea of Azov.

Habitat

The brown meagre is found at depths between 5m and 200m, mainly over rocky and sandy substrates and the young enter estuarine environments.

Description
The brown meagre  is between 30 and 40 cm in length but can grow to 60 cm. It has a flat belly and its strongly arched back which give it an easily recognisable shape, the body is laterally compressed and the large, horizontal mouth reaches the level of the eye and contains villiform teeth. The anal and pelvic fins are black with an anterior white border. Both dorsal fins and the truncate caudal fin, are yellow with a black border. The body is grey with flashes of gold and silver. The scales are ctenoid on the nape and the body while the head scales are cycloid.

Biology and behaviour

It is a rather nocturnal fish but it can occasionally be found during the day among beds of sea grass and on rocky bottoms in the vicinity of caves or large crevices where it can shelter. This species is social and lives in small groups. It feeds off the small fishes and crustaceans. They are capable of creating sound using some muscles under their well developed swim bladder. This is their way of communication since they have a very good hearing ability. They can manage their buoyancy perfectly. The spawning period is from March to August in the Mediterranean.

Fisheries
The brown meagre is a commercial species throughout the Mediterranean basin and has been over exploited by fishing practices. It is fished mainly by spear fishing, trammel nets, and gill nets and is heavily exposed to fisheries during spawning aggregations at the mouths of estuaries.

Sold fresh or frozen across fish markets in Turkey. The otoliths of the brown meagre are ground and used for urinary infections by local people in Turkey.  The sport and commercial fishing of this species was banned in Turkey until 2003 and 2006 to help conserve the stock.

References

External links

 

Fish of the Black Sea
Fish of the Mediterranean Sea
Fish described in 1758
Taxa named by Carl Linnaeus
Fish of Western Asia
Fish of Europe
Sciaenidae